Zsófia Simon (born December 17, 1989) is a Hungarian basketball player for UNI Győr and the Hungarian national team.

She participated at the EuroBasket Women 2017.

References

1989 births
Living people
Hungarian women's basketball players
Basketball players from Budapest
Shooting guards